lautten compagney BERLIN is a German instrumental ensemble based in Berlin. Founded in 1984 by Hans-Werner Apel and Wolfgang Katschner, now the principal conductor, it specializes in Early music and Baroque music, notably the operas of Handel.

Music 
lautten compagney BERLIN was founded in 1984 as a lute duo by lutenists Hans-Werner Apel and Wolfgang Katschner. The ensemble grew and plays in varied formation, specialising in Early music and Baroque music, notably the operas of Handel. Katschner is the principal conductor, Apel plays in the continuo group. Twice a year the group runs a festival, AEQUINOX, in Neuruppin.

The ensemble has frequently played choral works in concert and recording, collaborating with notable singers and ensembles. In varied formation from chamber ensemble to opera orchestra, they performed with vocal ensemble Capella Angelica, also founded by Katschner, and the Sing-Akademie zu Berlin, works including Handel's Der Messias and Bach's Passions. In 2007 they recorded cantatas by Dieterich Buxtehude. In 2010 they performed Bach's Köthener Trauermusik in the reconstruction by Alexander Ferdinand Grychtolik in the Sophienkirche Berlin. In 2011, they played Handel's opera Rinaldo, 300 years after its premiere, with Valer Barna-Sabadus in the title role. In 2012 they performed Handel's oratorio La resurrezione, staged by Kobie van Rensburg, and Bach's Christmas Oratorio. For the Rheingau Musik Festival's annual Marienvesper at Eberbach Abbey, they performed Monteverdi's Vespers in 2013 with ensemble amarcord and five additional guest singers.

In December 2015 the European Broadcasting Union included the lautten compagney BERLIN in its annual Christmas radio programme, which is broadcast across various European countries. The group played a selection of music from the Bach cantatas in instrumental arrangements.

Awards 

lautten compagney BERLIN won an ECHO Klassik award in 2010 in the category Ensemble – Alte Musik. They were awarded the Rheingau Music Prize in 2012.

Selected discography 

 Time Zones, Satie - Scheidt. Deutsche Harmonia Mundi, 2020
 Bach – Die Motetten. Deutsche Harmonia Mundi, 2012
 Handel with Care, instrumental arrangements of arias by Handel. Deutsche Harmonia Mundi, 2012
 Timeless, music by Tarquinio Merula and Philip Glass. Deutsche Harmonia Mundi, 2009
 Heinrich Schütz: Weihnachtshistorie and works by Dietrich Buxtehude, Johann Philipp Krieger, Johann Theile, Susanne Rydén, Christoph Prégardien, Capella Angelica. Berlin Classics, 2007
 Handel: Der Messias, German version by Johann Gottfried Herder (1780). Sharon Rostorf-Zamir, Maria Riccarda Wesseling, Kobie van Rensburg, Raimund Nolte, Dresdner Kammerchor. Deutsche Harmonia Mundi 2007
 Dietrich Buxtehude: Cantatas II, Capella Angelica. Carus-Verlag, 2007
 Buxtehude: Cantatas I,  Barbara Christina Steude. Carus-Verlag, 2007
 Buxtehude: Membra Jesu Nostri, Capella Angelica. Raumklang, 2006
 Carissimi: Dixit Dominus, Judicium Extremum. Capella Angelica. Coviello Classics, 2006
Artist recitals
 Henry Purcell: Love's Madness. Dorothee Mields, Carus Verlag, 2012
 Henry Purcell: Love Songs. Dorothee Mields, Carus Verlag, 2010
 Handel: La Diva – Arias for Cuzzoni, Simone Kermes. Berlin Classics
 Il pianto d'Orfeo, Kobie van Rensburg, New Classical Adventure 2006
 Mia Vita, Mio Bene, Ann Hallenberg and Ditte Andersen Berlin Classics, 2006
 Handel arias, Maria Ricarda Wesseling, Claves Records, 2005
 My personal Handel collection, Lynne Dawson, Berlin Classics, 2003
 Dolce mio ben, arias by Gasparini, Conti, Magini, Pistocchi, Sarri. Maite Beaumont, Berlin 2003
 Songs of an English cavalier, works by John Dowland, Thomas Campion, Henry Lawes, John Blow, Henry Purcell. Kobie van Rensburg, New Classical Adventure, 2001
 Handel's Beard, Kobie van Rensburg, New Classical Adventure, 2001
 Johann Philipp Krieger: Lieben und geliebt werden Arias, Mona Spägele, Wilfried Jochens, Wolf Matthias Friedrich, New Classical Adventure, 1995

References

External links 
 lautten compagney BERLIN official website
 
 lautten compagney BERLIN (Instrumental Ensemble) bach-cantatas

Early music orchestras
Musical groups established in 1984
1984 establishments in Germany
Musical groups from Berlin
German orchestras